A Malgaigne fracture is vertical pelvic fracture with bilateral sacroiliac dislocation and fracture of the pubic rami.

It is named for Joseph-François Malgaigne.

Classification

Tile classification - C3
Young-Burgess classification - VS
OTA/AO - 61-C3.1

References
Injuries of abdomen, lower back, lumbar spine and pelvis

External links